Nélson Cabral Semedo (born 16 November 1993) is a Portuguese professional footballer who plays as a right-back for Premier League club Wolverhampton Wanderers and the Portugal national team.

Semedo began his career at Sintrense before joining Benfica in 2012. After spending a season on loan at Fátima, he initially appeared for Benfica B before making his first-team debut in 2015 and going on to win back-to-back Primeira Liga titles, among other honours. In July 2017, he signed with Barcelona, winning La Liga in his first two seasons of a three-year stay. In September 2020, Semedo moved to Wolverhampton Wanderers on a three-year contract (with an option of two further years).

Semedo made his senior debut for Portugal in October 2015 and represented the nation at the 2017 FIFA Confederations Cup, the 2019 UEFA Nations League Finals and UEFA Euro 2020, winning the 2019 tournament on home soil.

Club career

Benfica
Born in Lisbon, Semedo came through the youth system at Sintrense, making his debut for the first team at age 17. On 12 January 2012, he and Manuel Liz signed five-year contracts with Benfica which were made effective on 1 July 2012. Both then spent one season on loan at Fátima in the third division.

Semedo returned to Benfica in the 2013 off-season, being assigned to the B-side in the Segunda Liga and making his professional debut on 10 August in a 0–0 away draw against Trofense. After nearly 60 appearances for the reserves, he was touted as a future replacement for long-time first-team incumbent Maxi Pereira.

After Pereira's departure, Semedo extended his contract until 2021 and joined the first team on their pre-season tour in North America in July 2015. On 9 August 2015, he made his debut for the main squad in the 0–1 loss against Sporting CP for the Supertaça Cândido de Oliveira. A week later, he scored his first goal for them, against Estoril in the Primeira Liga in a 4–0 home win.

After establishing himself in the starting 11, Semedo suffered a setback in October 2015 when he sustained an injury while with the Portugal national team. The ailment to his right knee required surgery, with him being expected to miss two months. He returned to action in early January, but could not reproduce his previous form and lost his place to André Almeida. Semedo finished the campaign in the reserve team.

In 2016–17, Semedo regained his starting position and went on to be Benfica's third-most used player in the club's historic fourth-straight league title. He scored once in the league in a 2–1 win on the road over Arouca and once in the UEFA Champions League in a 3–3 group stage draw to Beşiktaş.

In the final of the Taça de Portugal, played on 28 May 2017, Semedo assisted Eduardo Salvio for the second goal, with Benfica lifting the trophy after defeating Vitória de Guimarães 2–1. For his performances throughout the season, he won the Breakthrough Player of the Year award from the Liga Portuguesa de Futebol Profissional.

Barcelona
On 13 July 2017, Barcelona announced an agreement with Benfica for Semedo's signing, pending medical tests. He signed a five-year contract the following day, with the Portuguese club receiving €30.5 million plus another potential €5 million for every 50 matches he appeared in for his new team. He made his debut on 16 August in second leg of the Supercopa de España against Real Madrid, losing 0–2 at the Santiago Bernabéu Stadium.

Semedo made his Champions League debut for the club on 13 September 2017 and was praised for his performance during the 3–0 group stage win over Juventus. He scored his first competitive goal for the Catalans – and in La Liga – on 27 January 2019 in a 2–0 away victory against Girona.
His second goal came against Alavés in a 5–0 win in the season's final match.

Wolverhampton Wanderers
On 23 September 2020, Semedo moved to English Premier League club Wolverhampton Wanderers in a three-year contract (with an option of two further years) for an initial transfer fee of €30 million (approx. £27.5 million, with a potential further £9.2 million in add-ons) paid by Wolves. 

Semedo made his debut for Wolves and his first appearance in the Premier League in a 4–0 defeat away to West Ham United on 27 September 2020. He made his debut Molineux appearance for Wolves in the team's next Premier League match, a 1–0 victory over Fulham on 4 October 2020. He scored his first Wolves goal in head coach Nuno Espírito Santo's final game in charge, the final game of the 2020–21 Premier League season, a 1–2 home defeat to Manchester United on 23 May 2021.

Semedo suffered a hamstring injury in Wolves's game away to Arsenal in the Premier League on 24 February 2022; it was subsequently evaluated that the injury would keep him from returning to action for between four and eight weeks. He had played in 23 of Wolves's 25 Premier League games in the 2021–22 season at the point he sustained this injury. Semedo ultimately returned to first-team action on 24 April 2022 in a Premier League game at Burnley, playing the full 90 minutes plus stoppage time.

International career

Of Cape Verdean descent, Semedo was called-up to play for the Portugal national team on 2 October 2015 for UEFA Euro 2016 qualifying matches against Denmark and Serbia. He earned his first cap in the latter match, playing the entirety of a 2–1 win at the Partizan Stadium in Belgrade.

Semedo was selected for Portugal's 2017 FIFA Confederations Cup squad. He played the last match of the group stage, a 4–0 win against New Zealand. He also appeared in the third-place playoff against Mexico, being sent-off in the 106th minute as his team won the bronze medal.

Semedo was named in Portugal's preliminary 35-man squad for the 2018 FIFA World Cup. However, he was not selected for Portugal's final 23-man squad for tournament.

In October 2022, he was named in Portugal's preliminary 55-man squad for the 2022 FIFA World Cup in Qatar.

Style of play
Semedo is mainly known for his speed, ball control, dribbling and holding on the ball.

Career statistics

Club

Notes

International

Honours
Benfica
 Primeira Liga: 2015–16, 2016–17
 Taça de Portugal: 2016–17
 Taça da Liga: 2015–16
 Supertaça Cândido de Oliveira: 2016

Barcelona
 La Liga: 2017–18, 2018–19
 Copa del Rey: 2017–18
 Supercopa de España: 2018

Portugal
 UEFA Nations League: 2018–19
 FIFA Confederations Cup: Third place 2017

Individual
SJPF Primeira Liga Team of the Year: 2016, 2017
 LPFP Primeira Liga Breakthrough Player of the Year: 2016–17
 UEFA Champions League Breakthrough XI: 2017
 UEFA Nations League Finals Team of the Tournament: 2019

References

External links

Profile at the Wolverhampton Wanderers F.C. website

1993 births
Living people
Portuguese people of Cape Verdean descent
Footballers from Lisbon
Portuguese footballers
Association football defenders
Primeira Liga players
Liga Portugal 2 players
Segunda Divisão players
S.U. Sintrense players
C.D. Fátima players
S.L. Benfica B players
S.L. Benfica footballers
La Liga players
FC Barcelona players
Premier League players
Wolverhampton Wanderers F.C. players
Portugal international footballers
2017 FIFA Confederations Cup players
UEFA Euro 2020 players
UEFA Nations League-winning players
Portuguese expatriate footballers
Expatriate footballers in Spain
Portuguese expatriate sportspeople in Spain
Portuguese expatriate sportspeople in England
Expatriate footballers in England
Black Portuguese sportspeople